Daley Williams (born 15 May 1986) is a professional rugby league footballer who plays as a  or  for the London Skolars in the RFL League 1. He previously played for Salford in the Super League, Hunslet, Keighley Cougars, Batley Bulldogs, Dewsbury Rams & Rochdale Hornets.

Williams is known for facing a four-year ban for illegal doping of steroids. He claimed he did not have any intentions of taking the illegal substance, despite the fact he was worried about his weight loss and loss of strength at the time after breaking his jaw.

Background
Williams was born in Halifax, West Yorkshire, England.

Playing career
Before joining Batley Bulldogs, Williams played for Keighley Cougars and Dewsbury Rams.

In October 2018 he signed a one-year deal to play for Swinton Lions.

References

External links
 Williams Commits To Cougars
Rugby League Project

1986 births
Living people
Batley Bulldogs players
English people of Jamaican descent
Jamaican rugby league players
English rugby league players
Keighley Cougars players
London Skolars players
Rochdale Hornets players
Rugby articles needing expert attention
Rugby league players from Halifax, West Yorkshire
Rugby league wingers
Salford Red Devils players
Swinton Lions players